Power Plant No. 1 is an historic oil-burning power plant at 414 West Elizabeth Street in McPherson, Kansas.  The plant was added to the National Historic Register in 2007.

It was built in three phases from 1934 to 1947, and in combination the work achieves a refined Art Deco style.  The building held steam boilers and turbines.

References

Industrial buildings and structures on the National Register of Historic Places in Kansas
Fossil fuel power stations in the United States
Former oil-fired power stations in the United States
Power stations in Kansas
Buildings and structures in McPherson County, Kansas
Energy infrastructure on the National Register of Historic Places
National Register of Historic Places in McPherson County, Kansas
Art Deco architecture in Kansas
Former power stations in Kansas